Mount Atkinson is a prominent mountain 3.5 miles (6 km) west-southwest of Mount Craddock in the Sentinel Range, Antarctica. Mapped by United States Geological Survey (USGS) from surveys and U.S. Navy aerial photographs, 1957–60. Named by Advisory Committee on Antarctic Names (US-ACAN) after Richard C. Atkinson, Director, National Science Foundation, 1977–80.

See also
 Mountains in Antarctica

References

Ellsworth Mountains
Mountains of Ellsworth Land